The Heartland State Trail is a multi-use recreational rail trail in north-central Minnesota, USA. It runs  between Park Rapids and Cass Lake, intersecting with the Paul Bunyan State Trail around Walker.  The entire route is paved, with a parallel grass trackway along the southern half for horseback riding and mountain biking.  The northern half of the trail has some parallel trackway for snowmobiles.  A  segment north of Walker traverses very hilly terrain to appeal to snowmobilers; other users can follow a marked alternate route on paved road shoulders.

Established by an act of the Minnesota Legislature in 1974, the Heartland State Trail is one of the state's oldest rail trails.  A westward extension was approved in 2006 to run  from Park Rapids to Moorhead.  This section is still in the planning stages and the exact route has not been finalized.

The trail's current route runs from Park Rapids through Dorset, Nevis, Akeley, and Walker to Cass Lake. The trail connects the communities of Park Rapids, Dorset, Nevis, Akeley, Walker and Cass Lake.

References

External links
 Heartland State Trail

Minnesota state trails
Protected areas established in 1974
Protected areas of Cass County, Minnesota
Protected areas of Hubbard County, Minnesota
Rail trails in Minnesota
1974 establishments in Minnesota
National Recreation Trails in Minnesota